Life in the Undergrowth is a BBC nature documentary series written and presented by David Attenborough, first transmitted in the UK from 23 November 2005.

A study of the evolution and habits of invertebrates, it was the fifth of Attenborough's specialised surveys following his major trilogy that began with Life on Earth. Each of the five 50-minute episodes looks at a group (or aspect) of the creatures using innovative photographic techniques.

The series was produced in conjunction with Animal Planet. The executive producer was Mike Gunton, the series producer Mike Salisbury, and the music was composed by Ben Salisbury and David Poore. The Chief Scientific Consultant was Dr. George McGavin.

Background 

Invertebrates had been largely ignored by filmmakers in the past, due to the difficulties in filming them, but advances in lens and camera technology gave the makers an opportunity to film the creatures at their level. The series features a balance of everyday European invertebrates such as the wolf spider and housefly and more exotic varieties such as the redback spider of Australia and venomous centipedes of the Amazon. This was the first time that such animals had been photographed at such a high level of detail for television (some sequences were filmed in high definition format), and provided not only casual viewers but also scientists with a new understanding of certain species' behaviour.

Production of the series took around two years, during which time filming took place around the world, from the Amazonian rainforest to Costa Rica, Australia, Malaysia, Hungary, Switzerland and many more locations, including the United Kingdom.

To follow and understand the various species looked at throughout the series, the production team consulted with some of the foremost experts on invertebrate life. In certain instances, their help proved invaluable, particularly when coming across particularly dangerous species or societies. In other instances, the specialists helped to provide some of their most recent discoveries, enabling the makers to showcase in rich detail the complex processes through which invertebrates may interact with their environment, as well as the regular processes of all animals in the wild, such as their mating rituals and hunt for food. Many of the creatures' interactions were not only filmed for the first time, but were also recorded with such extraordinary magnification that scientists who studied them were able to answer specific questions that observance with the naked eye had hitherto rendered impossible.

As always, time and money constraints played a huge part. The filming schedules had to be arranged to fit in with expected dates of major events that were planned to be included, such as the emergence of the North American cicadas or the mass emergence of mayfly in Hungary. As is usual in the preparation of a nature documentary, not everything went to plan, due to the unpredictable nature of the subject matter.

Although filming took place over several years, time constraints still meant that some scenes almost weren't filmed, and a few never materialised at all. For instance, the simultaneous mass emergence of the mayfly in Hungary did not occur until the deadline day for its filming, as David Attenborough had to be in Switzerland the very next day to film the mating of wood ants. Using expert advice, the team had come to film at the time of the annual emergence, but the problem of the unusually wet spring had delayed the event. Luckily, on the very last day conditions were perfect, and the mayfly emerged – apparently in one of the more impressive manifestations of recent times. Because of these kinds of occurrences being largely dependent on environmental factors such as temperature or moisture, it was nearly impossible to tell exactly when they would happen. Instead the producers had to rely on expert estimates, but even these could be completely unpredictable. So although the mayfly appearance was captured, others were missed, such as the advent of a type of moth in Arizona (despite the camera crew camping out in the area twice, two weeks at a time).

Sometimes subjects were so small that it would have been impossible to film them in the wild. Instead, the construction of a complete habitat in a studio allowed easy pursuit of their actions, allowing the camera to capture them throughout their day. This technique was used on the wolf spider, for example, which provided some 200 hours of film – notably including its courting ritual. Despite the arm span of the grown spider being no more than 1 cm, even the newborn arachnids are shown in tight close-up as they climb on to their mother's back.

Filming also involved entering rough environments. To film the giant centipede, a team had to endure a dark cave whose floor was covered with guano, beetles and cockroaches.

Episodes

DVD and book 

The series is available in the UK for Regions 2 and 4 as a 2-disc DVD (BBCDVD1737, released 5 December 2005) and as part of The Life Collection. Its special features comprise an interview with the series producer, Mike Salisbury, and the original score.

The accompanying 320-page book, Life in the Undergrowth by David Attenborough, was published by BBC Books on 10 October 2005.

Viewer's guide 
In 2008, the BBC made available online a viewer's guide to Life in the Undergrowth, specially designed to help the viewer locate an exciting clip of a particular scientific or geographical lesson.

See also
Microcosmos (nature documentary with similar subject matter)

References

External links 
 
 Life in the Undergrowth at BBC Online
 Life in the Undergrowth on the Eden website
 
 Fly on the Wall at the Open University's Open2.net site

2005 British television series debuts
2005 British television series endings
BBC television documentaries
Nature educational television series
Articles containing video clips
Television series by BBC Studios